Andrés Felipe Balanta Cifuentes (18 January 2000 – 29 November 2022) was a Colombian professional footballer who played as defensive midfielder for Deportivo Cali and Atlético Tucumán. He represented his nation at the youth level. In June 2022, he joined Atlético Tucumán on loan from Deportivo Cali until June 2023 with a purchase option at the express request of the technical director Lucas Pusineri, this being his first international experience.

On 29 November 2022, during training, Balanta collapsed to the ground from cardiorespiratory arrest. Medical personnel unsuccessfully attempted resuscitation for 40 minutes.

References

2000 births
2022 deaths
Colombian footballers
Footballers from Cali
Association football midfielders
Colombia youth international footballers
Colombia under-20 international footballers
Categoría Primera A players
Argentine Primera División players
Deportivo Cali footballers
Atlético Tucumán footballers
Colombian expatriate footballers
Colombian expatriate sportspeople in Argentina
Expatriate footballers in Argentina
Association football players who died while playing
Sport deaths in Argentina
21st-century Colombian people